Keenjhar Lake Resort is a resort situated at Keenjhar lake, Thatta, Sindh, Pakistan operated by the Sindh Tourism Development Corporation. The resort is developed on the bank of Keenjhar lake, which is favorable and ideal place for winter migratory birds come from regions of North Asia in winter season.

About the name
Keenjhar lake has fresh water and it is named after Keenjhar, father of Noori a girl in the fishermen community. The Sufi poet of Sindh, Shah Abdul Latif Bhittai had made poetry about the love story of the girl, with the Jam Tamachi king falling in love and marrying with her.

Establishment
The resort was established in 1990 and renovated by Sindh Tourism Development Corporation in 2010.

Location
Keenjhar lake resort is situated on Hyderabad - Thatta highway, about 24 km from Thatta town to the north.

Tourist attractions
The Keenjhar Lake Resort is at the centre of the Thatta district, which has local historical tourist sites. Thatta was once the capital city of Sindh in Turkhan and Mughal Empire. Makli Necropolis is 24 km from the resort to the south. In Thatta district more than 200 archaeological and heritage sites are located in Thatta that remained the capital of Sindh for 350 years. There was a time when Thatta stood on the Indus River and thus prospered in trade with other areas. With the change of the River Indus, Thatta lost its importance. It was also a centre of learning with numerousmaddresas and schools of higher learning. It had a heritage of Islamic architecture from the 16th and 17th centuries.

References

External links
 STDC portal of Keenjhar Lake Resort

1990 establishments in Pakistan
Hotels established in 1990
Sindh Tourism Development Corporation Resorts